Friedrichstadt may refer to:

 Friedrichstadt, a town in Schleswig-Holstein
 Friedrichstadt (Amt), a collective municipality in Schleswig-Holstein
 Friedrichstadt (Berlin), a neighbourhood of Berlin
 Friedrichstadt (Dresden), a quarter of Dresden
 Düsseldorf-Friedrichstadt, a quarter of Düsseldorf
 Former name of the city of Jaunjelgava, Latvia
 Friedrichstadt, a former name (before 1918) for the district around Paechtown, South Australia